United Nations Security Council resolution 939, adopted on 29 July 1994, after recalling all relevant resolutions on Cyprus, the Council discussed the implementation of confidence-building measures as part of a wider process to settle the Cyprus dispute.

The Council reaffirmed that the status quo was unacceptable, noting the United Nations position that there should be a single Cyprus consisting of two politically equal communities in a bi-communal and bi-zonal federation, excluding union with another country or secession.

The Secretary-General Boutros Boutros-Ghali was requested to begin consultations with Security Council members, Guarantor Powers, and with leaders of the Republic of Cyprus and Northern Cyprus on ways to approach the Cyprus problem in a manner that would lead to results. In this context, all parties were urged to co-operate with the Secretary-General. A report was requested by the end of October 1994 concerning a programme for achieving an overall solution to the dispute and the implementation of the confidence-building measures.

Resolution 939 was adopted by 14 votes to none, while Rwanda was absent from the meeting.

See also
 Cyprus dispute
 List of United Nations Security Council Resolutions 901 to 1000 (1994–1995)
 United Nations Buffer Zone in Cyprus
 Turkish invasion of Cyprus

References

External links
 
Text of the Resolution at undocs.org

 0939
 0939
July 1994 events
1994 in Cyprus